Oratia is a semi-rural locality on the western edge of metropolitan West Auckland in New Zealand.

It is a relatively quiet community, bridging metropolitan Auckland with the wild forests and beaches of western Auckland.

Geography

The Oratia area is located at the foothills of Waitākere Ranges, forming a large portion of the Oratia Stream catchment, which flows north north-east towards Henderson. Central Oratia forms a part of the Waitematā-Waitākere foothills ecological zone. Sheltered from the Tasman Sea by the Waitākere Ranges, the area was traditionally dominated by forests of kauri, Phyllocladus trichomanoides (tānekaha or celery pine) and rimu, with abundant nīkau palm and silver fern. The soils are a mix of Miocene Waitākere volcanic soil and Waitemata Group sedimentary rock. The north-eastern lowlands in Oratia forms a part of the Waitematā lowland forests ecological zone, which historically featured a broadleaf forest of pūriri, tōtara, karaka and tītoki. The areas adjacent to the Oratia Stream form an alluvial flood zone, preferred by tōtara, tītoki and west coast kōwhai.

History

Pre-European history
The area is within the traditional rohe of Te Kawerau ā Maki, an iwi that traces their ancestry to some of the earliest inhabitants of the Auckland Region. The area is named after the Te Kawerau ā Maki pā and kāinga, which was located near modern-day Holden's Road. Carbon dating of shell middens on the western banks of the Oratia Stream near the pā showed evidence of occupation from at least 1570. The name Oratia traditionally referred to the middle and lower catchment areas of the Oratia Stream, while the upper catchment was known as Waihorotiu, named for the landslips which would occur in the area.

A Te Kawerau ā Maki myth involving the naming of the location involves Hauāuru, the personification of the western wind, and his wife. His wife found a sunny spot in the lower Waitākere Ranges foothills, where her sunbathing was noticed by Tama-nui-te-rā, the personification of the sun. Hauāuru was angered by this, and took his wife back to the Waitākere Ranges. The name Oratia refers to the sunny location where Hauāuru's wife sunbathed.

European settlement

In 1845, early settlers John Bishop and Thomas Canty began felling bush in Oratia. Oratia was first settled in the 1860s, with  land parcels granted to new immigrants. Cochrane's orchard was possibly the earliest orchard in the area dating back to this time, although it no longer exists. Sunnydale in Parker Road is the oldest surviving residence in West Auckland built around 1860 from Kauri timber milled on the site. Oratia Cemetery has burial sites dating from 1867 onwards. The gateway entrance was built in 1935. Its Category II listing is attributed to historical and visual significance.

When the area was settled by Europeans, the name Sunnyvale was often used (however this eventually only referred to the Sunnyvale suburb to the north-east), and the Oratia Stream was given the name Cantys Creek.

Thomas Parr, a pioneer orchardist and nurseryman, bought a  section between the Oratia and Waikumete streams in 1853. He established a plant nursery called Albion Vale on West Coast Road in 1879. Now a Category I Listed Building, the house has been restored to its original design after being used for many years as "The Town and Country Roadhouse", which was considered to be one of the finest restaurants in Auckland in the 1940s. The small Oratia Folk Museum is adjacent to Albion Vale. It was originally a small settler cottage built around 1870. After a hailstorm in 1904 damaged large quantities of fruit, the Parr family opened one of the first fruit canneries in Auckland, called Atherton after Thomas Parr's wife, which shut in 1910.

The Oratia Valley was settled by Dalmatian migrants in the late 1890s and early 1900s. They planted orchards and vineyards, leading to Oratia becoming known as the fruit bowl of Auckland. A strong sense of community developed which continues today, although some of the old families have moved out of the area. Many of Oratia's roads are named after the families who lived in Oratia in the 1800s, e.g. Parker, Carter, Shaw, Parr. Many of the original orchards have now disappeared. Although still relatively sparsely populated compared to most of metropolitan Auckland, Oratia has developed into a community with many businesses and homes.

From the 1930s until 2007, the Oratia valley was the home of Knock na Gree Camp, a Catholic youth camp. The camp was sold in 2008, The camp is now run as Bella Rakha, a Buddhist retreat.

Demographics

Oratia had a population of 2,151 at the 2018 New Zealand census, an increase of 114 people (5.6%) since the 2013 census, and an increase of 312 people (17.0%) since the 2006 census. There were 717 households, comprising 1,107 males and 1,041 females, giving a sex ratio of 1.06 males per female. The median age was 42.7 years (compared with 37.4 years nationally), with 441 people (20.5%) aged under 15 years, 354 (16.5%) aged 15 to 29, 1,119 (52.0%) aged 30 to 64, and 240 (11.2%) aged 65 or older.

Ethnicities were 92.5% European/Pākehā, 7.7% Māori, 3.2% Pacific peoples, 5.0% Asian, and 3.1% other ethnicities. People may identify with more than one ethnicity.

The percentage of people born overseas was 25.4, compared with 27.1% nationally.

Although some people chose not to answer the census's question about religious affiliation, 64.3% had no religion, 25.7% were Christian, 0.1% had Māori religious beliefs, 0.8% were Hindu, 0.1% were Muslim, 0.4% were Buddhist and 2.5% had other religions.

Of those at least 15 years old, 522 (30.5%) people had a bachelor's or higher degree, and 168 (9.8%) people had no formal qualifications. The median income was $41,600, compared with $31,800 nationally. 486 people (28.4%) earned over $70,000 compared to 17.2% nationally. The employment status of those at least 15 was that 939 (54.9%) people were employed full-time, 309 (18.1%) were part-time, and 42 (2.5%) were unemployed.

Amenities
Despite its small size, Oratia has a number of amenities:

 Landsendt is a large sub-tropical garden considered to be of national significance. A range of rare plants are grown here, many originally sourced from South America, and now forming a rare plant "gene bank".
 Oratia Folk Museum is a specialist museum established in 1992.
 Oratia Native Plant Nursery is one of the earliest native plant nurseries in New Zealand.

Notable people
Hugh Redgrove, a plant breeder from Oratia, introduced a Hebe named "Oratia Beauty" in 1982.

Ann Endt, an Oratia gardener, had a rose named after her.

Geoff Davidson of Oratia Native Plant Nursery received the Life Time Achievement Award from the New Zealand Plant Conservation Network in 2007 for his work to save species from extinction and being part of major initiatives to protect plants.

Graeme Gash of the folk rock band Waves was born and raised in Oratia.

Education
Oratia District School, established in 1882, provides primary (years 1–6) education for the area. It has 24 classrooms, a learning centre, hall and lunch room. It has a roll of  students as of  It serves Oratia and a catchment area extending to the coast at Piha and Karekare. There is also a kindergarten located on the same site.

The Bruce McLaren Intermediate school in Henderson, named after the New Zealand Racing Driver, provides education for year 7 and 8 students.

The local state secondary school is Henderson High School.

Liston College and St Dominic's College in Henderson both offer Catholic education.

References

External links
Photographs of Oratia held in Auckland Libraries' heritage collections.

Populated places in the Auckland Region
Waitākere Ranges Local Board Area
Waitākere Ranges
West Auckland, New Zealand